Vetro Energy is a Singapore and Houston, TX based operating and management company with Rezart Taçi as its majority shareholder. Vetro Energy targets upstream oil & gas investments worldwide. In October, 2012, Vetro Energy bid to privatize the Albania state-owned oil company Albpetrol.

Albpetrol acquisition 
On October 3, 2012, the Albania government announced, Vetro Energy won the bid for the privatization of Albpetrol, which would have given it the right to use the Albanian state-owned oil firm for the next 25 years.  Vetro’s bid of 850 million Euros ($1.1 billion) for Albpetrol was rated 97.7 points by Albania’s U.S. consultancy, Patton Boggs. Other bids included offers from China’s Win Business Bright Oil, and Canada’s Bankers Petroleum.  After winning the bid to buy Albpetrol, Rezart Taçi announced on November 22, 2012, Vetro Energy had completed the financing of 850 million Euros to finance the transaction.

The deal was subsequently cancelled by the Albanian government after Vetro Energy failed to pay the initial payment.

References 

Oil and gas companies of Singapore
Oil companies of the United States